Agostino is both a masculine Italian given name and an Italian surname. Notable people with the name include:

Given name

A
 Agostino Abbagnale (born 1966), Italian rower and gold medalist
 Agostino Agazzari (1578–1640), Italian composer
 Agostino Aglio (1777–1857), Italian painter, decorator, and engraver
 Agostino Agostini (died 1569), Renaissance era singer, composer and priest
 Agostino Apollonio ( 1530s) was an Italian painter of the Renaissance

B
 Agostino Barbarigo (c. 1420–1501), Doge of Venice
 Agostino Barbarigo (admiral) (1518–1571), Venetian nobleman and commander
 Agostino Barelli (1627–c. 1687), Italian architect of the Baroque
 Agostino Di Bartolomei (1955–1994), Italian footballer
 Agostino Bassi (1773–1856), Italian entomologist
 Agostino Beltrano (died 1665), Italian painter active in the Baroque period in Naples
 Agostino Bernal (1587–1642), Spanish Jesuit theologian
 Agostino Bertani (1812–1886), Italian revolutionary and physician
 Agostino Bonello (born 1949), Maltese production designer, art director and film producer
 Agostino Bonisoli (1633–1700), Italian painter of the Baroque period
 Agostino Borgato (1871–1939), Italian actor and director
 Agostino Brunias (c. 1730–1796), London-based Italian painter from Rome
 Agostino Bugiardini (died 1623), Italian sculptor active in the early-Baroque period
 Agostino Busti (c. 1483–1548), Italian sculptor of the High Renaissance

C
 Agostino Cacciavillan (born 1926), Italian Cardinal of the Catholic Church
 Agostino Camigliano (born 1994), Italian footballer 
 Agostino Campanella ( 1770), Italian painter and engraver
 Agostino Cardamone (born 1965), Italian boxer
 Agostino Carlini (c. 1718–1790), Italian sculptor and painter
 Agostino Carollo, Italian music producer
 Agostino Carracci (1557–1602), Italian painter and graphical artist
 Agostino Casaroli (1914–1998), Italian Catholic priest and diplomat for the Holy See
 Agostino Castellaci (born 1670), Italian painter of the Baroque period
 Agostino Chigi (1466–1520), Italian banker and patron of the Renaissance
 Agostino Chiodo (1791–1861), prime minister of the Kingdom of Sardinia
 Agostino Ciampelli (1565–1630), Italian painter of the Baroque period
 Agostino Ciasca (1835–1902), Italian priest and Cardinal
 Agostino Codazzi (1793–1859), Italian military, scientist, geographer, cartographer, and governor
 Agostino Collaceroni ( 17th century), Italian painter, of quadratura
 Agostino Cornacchini (1686–1754), Italian sculptor and painter of the Rococo period
 Agostino Cottolengo (1794–1853), Italian painter
 Agostino Crosti (1896–1988), Italian dermatologist and professor

D
 Agostino Dati (1420–1478), Italian orator, historian and philosopher
 Agostino Depretis (1813–1887), Italian statesman and Prime Minister

F
 Agostino Falivene (died 1548), Roman Catholic bishop
 Agostino Fantastici (1782–1845), Italian scenic designer and architect
 Agostino de Fondulis ( 1483–1522), Italian sculptor and architect
 Agostino Frassinetti (1897–1968) was an Italian freestyle swimmer
 Agostino Fregoso (1442-1486) was an Italian condottiero

G
 Agostino Galamini (1553–1639), Italian cardinal and bishop
 Agostino Gallo (1499–1570), Italian agronomist
 Agostino Garofalo (born 1984), Italian footballer
 Agostino Gemelli (1878–1959), Italian Franciscan friar, physician and psychologist
 Agostino Ghesini (born 1958), Italian javelin thrower
 Agostino Giuntoli (1903–1992), Italian-born American nightclub owner and entrepreneur
 Agostino Giustiniani (1470–1536), Italian Catholic bishop, linguist and geographer

I
 Agostino Imondi ( 2000s), Italian documentary film director

L
 Agostino Lamma (1636–1700), Italian painter, active in Venice and specializing in battle paintings
 Agostino Lanfranchi (1892–1963), Italian bobsledder and skeleton racer
 Agostino Lanzillo (1886–1952), Italian revolutionary syndicalist leader
 Agostino Lo Piano Pomar (1871–1927), Sicilian lawyer, socialist and politician

M
 Agostino Maccari (17th Century), Italian astronomer
 Agostino Magliani (1824-1891), Italian financier
 Agostino Marti (1485–1537), Italian painter
 Agostino Masucci (c. 1691–1758), Italian painter of the late-Baroque or Rococo period
 Agostino Melissi (1615–1683), Italian painter of the Baroque period
 Agostino Mitelli (1609–1660), Italian painter of the Baroque period

N
 Agostino Nifo (c. 1473–1538 or 1545), Italian philosopher and commentator
 Agostino Novello (1240–1309), Italian religious figure

P
 Agostino Paradisi (1736–1783), Italian poet, economist and teacher
 Agostino Podestà (1905-1969), Italian fascist

R
 Agostino Ramelli (1531–c. 1610), Italian engineer
 Agostino Recuperati (died 1540), Italian preacher
 Agostino Richelmy (1850–1923), Italian Cardinal of the Roman Catholic Church
 Agostino Rocca (1895–1978), Italian businessman
 Agostino Roscelli (1818–1902), Italian priest and saint
 Agostino Rovere (1804-1865), Italian operatic bass

S
 Agostino Scilla (1629–1700), Italian painter, paleontologist, geologist, and pioneer in the study of fossil
 Agostino da Siena  (c. 1285–c. 1347), Italian architect and sculptor
 Agostino Spinola (c. 1482–1537), Italian Roman Catholic bishop and cardinal
 Agostino Steffani (1654–1728), Italian diplomat and composer
 Agostino Steuco (1497–1548), Italian humanist, Old Testament scholar, polemicist and antiquarian
 Agostino Straulino (1914–2004), Italian sailor and sailboat racer

T
 Agostino Tassi (1578–1644), Italian painter
 Agostino Todaro (1818–1892), Italian botanist
 Agostino Trivulzio (c. 1485–1548), Italian Cardinal and papal legate

V
 Agostino Valier (1531–1606), Italian cardinal and bishop of Verona
 Agostino Vallini (born 1940), Italian cardinal of the Roman Catholic Church
 Agostino Veneziano (c. 1490–c. 1540), Italian engraver of the Renaissance
 Agostino Veracini (1689–1762), Italian painter and engraver
 Agostino Vespucci, Florentine chancellery official and government clerk

Surname
 Dominic Agostino (1959–2004), Canadian politician 
 Giuseppe Agostino (1928–2014), Italian Roman Catholic archbishop
 Kenny Agostino (born 1992), American ice hockey player
 Paolo Agostino (c. 1583–1629), Italian composer and organist of the early Baroque era
 Paul Agostino (born 1975), Australian footballer

See also
 D'Agostino

Italian masculine given names
Italian-language surnames